Collista is an unincorporated community in Johnson County, Kentucky, United States, located along U.S. Route 23 and Jenny's Creek. Its ZIP code is 41222.

References

Unincorporated communities in Johnson County, Kentucky
Unincorporated communities in Kentucky